The Tutova is a right tributary of the river Bârlad in Romania. It discharges into the Bârlad in the village Tutova. It flows through the villages Plopana, Străminoasa, Dragomirești, Mărășești, Puiești, Iana, Pogana, Ciocani, Ivești and Pogonești. The Cuibul Vulturilor Dam is located on the river Tutova.

Tributaries

The following rivers are tributaries to the river Tutova (from source to mouth):
Left: Lipova, Popești, Iezer, Studineț
Right: Tulești, Mărul, Fulgul, Ciubota, Cârjoani

References

Rivers of Romania
Rivers of Bacău County
Rivers of Vaslui County